An hourglass (or sandglass, sand timer, sand clock or egg timer) is a device used to measure the passage of time. It comprises two glass bulbs connected vertically by a narrow neck that allows a regulated flow of a substance (historically sand) from the upper bulb to the lower one. Typically, the upper and lower bulbs are symmetric so that the hourglass will measure the same duration regardless of orientation. The specific duration of time a given hourglass measures is determined by factors including the quantity and coarseness of the particulate matter, the bulb size, and the neck width.

Depictions of an hourglass as a symbol of the passage of time are found in art, especially on tombstones or other monuments, from antiquity to the present day. The form of a winged hourglass has been used as a literal depiction of the well-known idiom "time flies".

History

Antiquity 

The origin of the hourglass is unclear. Its predecessor the clepsydra, or water clock, is known to have existed in Babylon and Egypt as early as the 16th century BC.

Early Middle Ages 

There are no records of the hourglass existing in Europe prior to the Early Middle Ages; the first documented example dates from the 8th century AD, crafted by a Frankish monk named Liutprand who served at the cathedral in Chartres, France. But it was not until the 14th century that the hourglass was seen commonly, the earliest firm evidence being a depiction in the 1338 fresco Allegory of Good Government by Ambrogio Lorenzetti.

Use of the marine sandglass has been recorded since the 14th century. The written records about it were mostly from logbooks of European ships. In the same period it appears in other records and lists of ships stores. The earliest recorded reference that can be said with certainty to refer to a marine sandglass dates from c. 1345, in a receipt of Thomas de Stetesham, clerk of the King's ship La George, in the reign of Edward III of England; translated from the Latin, the receipt says: in 1345:
"The same Thomas accounts to have paid at Lescluse, in Flanders, for twelve glass horologes (" pro xii. orlogiis vitreis "), price of each 4½ gross', in sterling 9s. Item, For four horologes of the same sort (" de eadem secta "), bought there, price of each five gross', making in sterling 3s. 4d." 

Marine sandglasses were very popular on board ships, as they were the most dependable measurement of time while at sea. Unlike the clepsydra, the motion of the ship while sailing did not affect the hourglass. The fact that the hourglass also used granular materials instead of liquids gave it more accurate measurements, as the clepsydra was prone to get condensation inside it during temperature changes. Seamen found that the hourglass was able to help them determine a ship's speed. They would tie a knot every 40-50 feet in a line, tie it to a log, toss the log into the water, then count how many knots slipped through their fingers in the interval measured by the glass. An accurate clock would also have enabled a seaman to determine longitude, distance east or west from a certain point, but an error of four minutes would correspond to one degree of longitude, or some 70 statute miles, so it's doubtful whether an hourglass ever made this practical.

The hourglass also found popularity on land. As the use of mechanical clocks to indicate the times of events like church services became more common, creating a "need to keep track of time", the demand for time-measuring devices increased. Hourglasses were essentially inexpensive, as they required no rare technology to make and their contents were not hard to come by, and as the manufacturing of these instruments became more common, their uses became more practical.

Hourglasses were commonly seen in use in churches, homes, and work places to measure sermons, cooking time, and time spent on breaks from labor. Because they were being used for more everyday tasks, the model of the hourglass began to shrink. The smaller models were more practical and very popular as they made timing more discreet.

After 1500, the hourglass was not as widespread as it had been. This was due to the development of the mechanical clock, which became more accurate, smaller and cheaper, and made keeping time easier. The hourglass, however, did not disappear entirely. Although they became relatively less useful as clock technology advanced, hourglasses remained desirable in their design. The oldest known surviving hourglass resides in the British Museum in London.

Not until the 18th century did John Harrison come up with a marine chronometer that significantly improved on the stability of the hourglass at sea. Taking elements from the design logic behind the hourglass, he made a marine chronometer in 1761 that was able to accurately measure the journey from England to Jamaica accurate within five seconds.

Design
Little written evidence exists to explain why its external form is the shape that it is. The glass bulbs used, however, have changed in style and design over time. While the main designs have always been ampoule in shape, the bulbs were not always connected. The first hourglasses were two separate bulbs with a cord wrapped at their union that was then coated in wax to hold the piece together and let sand flow in between. It was not until 1760 that both bulbs were blown together to keep moisture out of the bulbs and regulate the pressure within the bulb that varied the flow.

Material
While some early hourglasses actually did use silica sand as the granular material to measure time, many did not use sand at all. The material used in most bulbs was "powdered marble, tin/lead oxides, [or] pulverized, burnt eggshell". Over time, different textures of granule matter were tested to see which gave the most constant flow within the bulbs. It was later discovered that for the perfect flow to be achieved the ratio of granule bead to the width of the bulb neck needed to be 1/12 or more but not greater than 1/2 the neck of the bulb.

Practical uses

Hourglasses were an early dependable and accurate measure of time. The rate of flow of the sand is independent of the depth in the upper reservoir, and the instrument will not freeze in cold weather. From the 15th century onwards, hourglasses were being used in a range of applications at sea, in the church, in industry, and in cookery.
 
During the voyage of Ferdinand Magellan around the globe, 18 hourglasses from Barcelona were in the ship's inventory, after the trip had been authorized by King Charles I of Spain. It was the job of a ship's page to turn the hourglasses and thus provide the times for the ship's log. Noon was the reference time for navigation, which did not depend on the glass, as the sun would be at its zenith. A number of sandglasses could be fixed in a common frame, each with a different operating time, e.g. as in a four-way Italian sandglass likely from the 17th century, in the collections of the Science Museum, in South Kensington, London, which could measure intervals of quarter, half, three-quarters, and one hour (and which were also used in churches, for priests and ministers to measure lengths of sermons).

Modern practical uses

While they are no longer widely used for keeping time, some institutions do maintain them. Both houses of the Australian Parliament use three hourglasses to time certain procedures, such as divisions.

The sandglass is still widely used as the kitchen egg timer; for cooking eggs, a three-minute timer is typical, hence the name "egg timer" for three-minute hourglasses. Egg timers are sold widely as souvenirs.
Sand timers are also sometimes used in games such as Pictionary and Boggle to implement a time constraint on rounds of play.

Symbolic uses

Unlike most other methods of measuring time, the hourglass concretely represents the present as being between the past and the future, and this has made it an enduring symbol of time itself.

The hourglass, sometimes with the addition of metaphorical wings, is often depicted as a symbol that human existence is fleeting, and that the "sands of time" will run out for every human life. It was used thus on pirate flags, to strike fear into the hearts of the pirates' victims. In England, hourglasses were sometimes placed in coffins, and they have graced gravestones for centuries. The hourglass was also used in alchemy as a symbol for hour.

The former Metropolitan Borough of Greenwich in London used an hourglass on its coat of arms, symbolising Greenwich's role as the origin of GMT. The district's successor, the Royal Borough of Greenwich, uses two hourglasses on its coat of arms.

Modern symbolic uses

Recognition of the hourglass as a symbol of time has survived its obsolescence as a timekeeper. For example, the American television soap opera Days of Our Lives, since its first broadcast in 1965, has displayed an hourglass in its opening credits, with the narration, "Like sands through the hourglass, so are the days of our lives," spoken by Macdonald Carey.

Various computer graphical user interfaces may change the pointer to an hourglass during a period when the program is in the middle of a task, and may not accept user input. During that period other programs, for example in different windows, may work normally. When such an hourglass does not disappear, it suggests a program is in an infinite loop and needs to be terminated, or is waiting for some external event (such as the user inserting a CD). Unicode has an HOURGLASS symbol at U+231B (⌛).

Hourglass motif

Because of its symmetry, graphic signs resembling an hourglass are seen in the art of cultures which never encountered such objects. Vertical pairs of triangles joined at the apex are common in Native American art; both in North America, where it can represent, for example, the body of the Thunderbird or (in more elongated form) an enemy scalp, and in South America, where it is believed to represent a Chuncho jungle dweller. In Zulu textiles they symbolise a married man, as opposed to a pair of triangles joined at the base, which symbolise a married woman. Neolithic examples can be seen among Spanish cave paintings. Observers have even given the name "hourglass motif" to shapes which have more complex symmetry, such as a repeating circle and cross pattern from the Solomon Islands. Both the members of Project Tic Toc, from television series the Time Tunnel and the Challengers of the Unknown use symbols of the hourglass representing either time travel or time running out.

See also
 List of largest hourglasses
 Marine sandglass
 Water clock
 Hourglass figure

References

Further reading

Books
 
 
 
 

Periodicals